Volčje Njive is a small settlement just east of Mirna in the Municipality of Mirna in southeastern Slovenia. The municipality is included in the Southeast Slovenia Statistical Region. The entire area is part of the traditional region of Lower Carniola.

Name
Volčje Njive was attested in historical sources as Weyczakker in 1436 and as Weizakker and Wetschakker in 1455.

References

External links
Volčje Njive on Geopedia

Populated places in the Municipality of Mirna